The following is a list of Africa Movie Academy Awards ceremonies including ceremony date, ceremony host and the Best Film award winner.

Nomination Venues

Ceremonies

References 

Lists of award ceremonies
Award ceremonies